Maike Schaunig (born 13 March 1996) is a German field hockey player for the German national team.

She participated at the 2018 Women's Hockey World Cup.

References

1996 births
Living people
German female field hockey players
Female field hockey defenders
Field hockey players at the 2020 Summer Olympics
Olympic field hockey players of Germany
21st-century German women